Khalifa Ghedbane (born November 26, 1996) is an Algerian handball player who plays for Dinamo București  and the Algerian national team.

Honours
RK Vardar
EHF Champions League: 2018-19
2018-19 SEHA League

Dinamo București
National League: 2021-2022
Romanian cup: 2021-2022

References

1996 births
Living people
Algerian male handball players
Algerian expatriate sportspeople in Spain
Expatriate handball players
Algerian expatriate sportspeople in North Macedonia
Algerian expatriate sportspeople in Romania
People from Blida
RK Vardar players
CS Dinamo București (men's handball) players
21st-century Algerian people
Mediterranean Games competitors for Algeria
Competitors at the 2022 Mediterranean Games